Zhangbei may refer to:
Zhangbei (town), the county seat of Zhangbei County, Hebei, China
Zhangbei County, a county in Hebei, China